The brown-and-yellow marshbird (Pseudoleistes virescens) is a species of bird in the family Icteridae.

It is found in the Pampas and north to the Paraguayan border and Rio Grande do Sul, where its natural habitats are swamps and pastureland.

References

External links
Photo – oiseaux.net

brown-and-yellow marshbird
Birds of Argentina
Birds of Uruguay
brown-and-yellow marshbird
Taxa named by Louis Jean Pierre Vieillot
Taxonomy articles created by Polbot